The tepui parrotlet (Nannopsittaca panychlora) is a species of parrot in the family Psittacidae.
It is found in the tepuis of northern Brazil, western Guyana, and southern Venezuela.

Description 
It is light green with brown eyes. Its tail is short and round.
Its natural habitats are subtropical or tropical moist lowland forest, and subtropical, or tropical moist montane forest from 750 to 2,200 meters elevation.

References

tepui parrotlet
Birds of the Tepuis
tepui parrotlet
tepui parrotlet
tepui parrotlet
Taxonomy articles created by Polbot